David Zawada (born ) is a German mixed martial artist currently competing in the Welterweight division. A professional since 2010, he has formerly competed for the Ultimate Fighting Championship (UFC), Konfrontacja Sztuk Walki (KSW), and Respect FC where he is the former Welterweight Champion.

Background
Zawada trains at UFD Gym in Düsseldorf where he trains alongside  KSW champion Roberto Soldić, Erko Jun, Antun Racic and his brother, Martin Zawada.

Mixed martial arts career

Early career
Zawada participated in various regional MMA promotions, notable in  KSW primarily in the Europe. He was the formal welterweight Respect Fighting Championship and Shooto Kings champion. He amassed a record of 16–3 prior signed by Ultimate Fighting Championship (UFC).

Ultimate Fighting Championship
Zawada made his UFC debut on July 22, 2018, against Danny Roberts, replacing injured Alan Jouban at UFC Fight Night: Shogun vs. Smith. He lost the fight via split decision. This fight earned him the Fight of the Night award.

His next faced Li Jingliang on November 24, 2018, replacing Elizeu Zaleski dos Santos at UFC Fight Night: Blaydes vs. Ngannou 2. He lost the fight via technical knockout in round three.

Zawada faced Abubakar Nurmagomedov on November 9, 2019 at UFC on ESPN+ 21. He won the fight via a submission in round one. This fight earned him the Performance of the Night award.

Zawada was scheduled to face Anthony Rocco Martin on April 25, 2020. However, on April 9, the promotion indicated that the pairing was scrapped due to the COVID-19 pandemic.

Zawada was expected to face Mounir Lazzez on October 18, 2020 at UFC Fight Night 180.  However, on October 6, 2020 it was reported that Lazzez tested positive for COVID-19 and was removed from the bout. It is unclear at the stage if a replacement would be sought by the UFC officials.

Zawada faced Ramazan Emeev on January 16, 2021 at UFC on ABC 1. He lost a close fight by split decision.

Zawada was scheduled to face Sergey Khandozhko on September 4, 2021 at UFC Fight Night 191.  However, the week before the event, Khandozhko was pulled from the contest for unknown reasons and replaced by Alex Morono. Zawada lost the fight via unanimous decision.

On February 10, 2022, it was announced that Zawada was no longer on the UFC roster.

Post UFC 
Zawada made his first appearance after his UFC debut against Erhan Kartal on June 4, 2022 at Oktagon 33. He won the bout via doctor stoppage after the first round.

Championships and accomplishments

Mixed martial arts
Ultimate Fighting Championship
Performance of the Night (One time) 
Fight of the Night (One time) 
MMAJunkie.com
2019 November Submission of the Month 
Respect Fighting Championship 
2016 Respect FC welterweight champion
Shooto Kings
2016 Shooto Kings welterweight champion

Personal life 
Zawada older brother, Martin Zawada, is also a MMA fighter for the Konfrontacja Sztuk Walki promotion.

Mixed martial arts record

|-
| Win
| align=center|18–7 
|Erhan Kartal
|TKO (doctor stoppage)
|Oktagon 33
|
|align=center|1
|align=center|5:00
|Frankfurt, Germany
|
|-
|Loss
| align=center|17–7
| Alex Morono
|Decision (unanimous)
| UFC Fight Night: Brunson vs. Till 
| 
| align=center|3
| align=center|5:00
| Las Vegas, Nevada, United States
|
|-
|  Loss
| align=center|17–6
| Ramazan Emeev
| Decision (split)
| UFC on ABC: Holloway vs. Kattar 
| 
| align=center|3
| align=center|5:00
| Abu Dhabi, United Arab Emirates
| 
|-
|  Win
| align=center|17–5 
| Abubakar Nurmagomedov
| Submission (triangle choke)
| UFC Fight Night: Magomedsharipov vs. Kattar
| 
| align=center| 1
| align=center| 2:50
| Moscow, Russia
| 
|-
|  Loss
| align=center|16–5 
| Li Jingliang
| TKO (body kick and punches)
| UFC Fight Night: Blaydes vs. Ngannou 2
| 
| align=center| 3
| align=center| 4:07
| Beijing, China 
|
|-
|  Loss
| align=center|16–4
| Danny Roberts
| Decision (split)
| UFC Fight Night: Shogun vs. Smith
| 
| align=center| 3
| align=center| 5:00
| Hamburg, Germany
| 
|-
|  Win
| align=center|16–3 
| Michał Michalski
| Submission (rear-naked choke)
| KSW 43
| 
| align=center| 3
| align=center| 0:48
| Wrocław, Poland
|
|-
|  Win
| align=center|15–3 
|Maciej Jewtuszko
| Decision (unsnimous)
| KSW 40
| 
| align=center| 3
| align=center| 5:00
| Dublin, Ireland
|
|-
|  Win
| align=center|14–3 
| Andreas Ståhl
|TKO (punches)
| German MMA Championship 11
| 
| align=center| 1
| align=center| 1:24
| Castrop-Rauxel, Germany
|
|-
|  Win
| align=center|13–3 
| Robert Radomski
| TKO (punches)
|KSW 37
| 
| align=center| 1
| align=center| 1:24
| Kraków, Poland
|
|-
|  Win
| align=center|12–3 
| Stefan Larisch
| KO (punches)
| Respect FC 16
| 
| align=center| 1
| align=center| 0:30
| Cologne, Germany
|
|-
|  Loss
| align=center| 11–3
| Kamil Szymuszowski
| Decision (split)
| KSW 33
| 
| align=center| 3
| align=center| 5:00
| Kraków, Poland
|
|-
|  Win
| align=center| 11–2
| Stefan Sekulić
| TKO (punches)
| Serbian Battle Championship 6
| 
| align=center| 2
| align=center| 2:24
| Vojvodina, Serbia
|
|-
|  Win
| align=center| 10–2
| Aldin Osmančević
| TKO (punches)
| Montenegro Fighting Championship 3
| 
| align=center| 1
| align=center| 0:47
| Budva, Montenegro
|
|-
|  Loss
| align=center| 9–2
| Borys Mańkowski
| Submission (arm-triangle choke)
| KSW 29
| 
| align=center| 1
| align=center| 1:20
| Kraków, Poland
|
|-
|  Win
| align=center| 9–1
| Sebastian Risch
| TKO (doctor stoppage)
| German MMA Championship 5
| 
| align=center| 1
| align=center| 2:39
| Castrop-Rauxel, Germany
|
|-
|  Win
| align=center| 8–1
| Luca Vitali
| KO (punch)
| Swiss MMA Championship 1
| 
| align=center| 2
| align=center| 0:48
| Basel, Switzerland
|
|-

|  Loss
| align=center| 7–1
| Djamil Chan
| KO (knees)
| Respect FC 9
| 
| align=center| 1
| align=center| 1:34
| Dormagen, Germany
|
|-
|  Win
| align=center| 7–0
| Kerim Engizek
| Decision (majority)
| SFC 11
| 
| align=center| 3
| align=center| 5:00
| Düren, Germany
|
|-
|  Win
| align=center| 6–0
| Egny Borges
| Submission (guillotine choke)
| SFC 10
| 
| align=center| 1
| align=center| 1:04
| Mainz, Germany
|
|-
|  Win
| align=center| 5–0
| Garcia Chambe
| TKO (corner stoppage)
| SFC 9
| 
| align=center| 1
| align=center| 4:37
| Göppingen, Germany
|
|-
|  Win
| align=center| 4–0
| Maurice Skrober
| TKO (corner stoppage)
| SFC 8
| 
| align=center| 1
| align=center| 4:50
| Mainz, Germany
|
|-
|  Win
| align=center| 3–0
| Florian Ziebert
| KO (flying knee and punches)
| Respect FC 5
| 
| align=center| 2
| align=center| 0:21
| Essen, Germany
|
|-
|  Win
| align=center| 2–0
| Nerijus Slepetis
| Submission (guillotine choke)
| GMA 7
| 
| align=center| 1
| align=center| 4:27
| Düsseldorf, Germany
|
|-
|  Win
| align=center| 1–0
| Michael Zabrocki
| TKO (punches)
| GMA 6
| 
| align=center| 1
| align=center| 2:34
| Düsseldorf, Germany
|
|-

See also
 List of male mixed martial artists

References

External links

1990 births
Living people
German male mixed martial artists
Welterweight mixed martial artists
Middleweight mixed martial artists
German people of Polish descent
Ultimate Fighting Championship male fighters